was a province of Japan in the area of modern Chiba Prefecture. The province was located in the middle of the Bōsō Peninsula, whose name takes its first kanji from the name of Awa Province and its second from Kazusa and Shimōsa provinces. The borders of Kazusa Province were defined by Shimōsa Province to the north, the Pacific Ocean to the east, Awa Province to the south, and Tokyo Bay to the west.

Kazusa was classified as one of the provinces of the Tōkaidō. Under the Engishiki classification system, Kazusa was ranked as a "great country" (大国) and a "far country" in relation to its distance from the capital (遠国). Along with Kōzuke and Hitachi, it was originally one of the provinces where an imperial prince was nominally assigned as governor.

History

Early history
Kazusa and Shimōsa) during the reign of Emperor Kōtoku (645–654). It was well known to the Imperial Court in Nara -period Japan for its fertile lands, and is mentioned in Nara period records as having supplied hemp to the Court. Kazusa was divided into 15 counties, of which the four counties comprising  the district of Awa were separated in 718 into a separate province. The exact location of the capital of Kazusa is not precisely known, but is believed to have been somewhere within the borders of the modern city of Ichihara, Chiba. The ruins of the kokubun-ji, or provincial temple, of Kazusa has been located in the Sōza district of Ichihara. The site is protected as a Designated Historic Site of Japan. However, the Ichinomiya of Kazusa Province is the Tamasaki Shrine in what is now the town of Ichinomiya, Chiba, on the opposite coast of the province.

During the Heian period, the province was divided into numerous shōen controlled by local samurai clans, primarily the Chiba clan, which sided with Minamoto no Yoritomo in the Genpei War. During the Kamakura period, much of the province was under the control of the Ashikaga clan. By the early Muromachi period, the area was a highly contested region highly fragmented by various samurai clans. However, by the Sengoku period, the Satomi clan had gained control over much of Awa, Kazusa and Shimōsa provinces.

The Satomi provided only lukewarm support to Toyotomi Hideyoshi during the Battle of Odawara against the Later Hōjō clan and were subsequently deprived of their holdings in Kazusa and Shimōsa. After the installation of Tokugawa Ieyasu in Edo, Kazusa became part of the Tokugawa clan holdings, and Tokugawa hereditary retainer Honda Tadakatsu was promoted to daimyō of Ōtaki Domain (50,000 koku).

Edo period

During the Edo period, several small domains were created within the borders of Kazusa, most of which continued to be retained as  tenryō territory owned directly by the shōgun and administered by various hatamoto.  The entire province had an assessed revenue of 425,080 koku.

Edo period Domains in Kazusa Province

Abolishment
Following the Boshin War, Jōzai Domain was abolished for its opposition to the Meiji Restoration, and six minor domains were created for daimyō dispossessed with the creation of Sunpu Domain for the ex-shōgun Tokugawa Yoshinobu. These various domains and tenryō territories were transformed into short-lived prefectures in July 1871 by the abolition of the han system, and the entire territory of Kazusa Province became part of the new Chiba Prefecture on June 15, 1873.

Historical districts
The area of former Kazusa Province was organized into nine districts by the Meiji period cadastral reforms, later reduced to five:
 Chiba Prefecture
 Amaha District (:ja:天羽郡) - merged with Mōda and Sue Districts to become Kimitsu District (:ja: 君津郡) on April 1, 1897
 Ichihara District (:ja:市原郡) - dissolved
 Isumi District (:ja: 夷隅郡)
 Kamihabu District (:ja:上埴生郡) - merged with Nagara District to become Chōsei District (:ja: 長生郡) on April 1, 1897
 Mōda District (:ja:望陀郡) - merged with Amaha and Sue Districts to become Kimitsu District on April 1, 1897
 Musha District (:ja:武射郡) - merged with Yamabe District to become Sanbu District (:ja: 山武郡) on April 1, 1897
 Nagara District (:ja:長柄郡) - merged with Kamihabu District to become Chōsei District on April 1, 1897
 Sue District (:ja:周淮郡) - merged with Amaha and Mōda Districts to become Kimitsu District on April 1, 1897
 Yamabe District (:ja:山辺郡) - merged with Musha District to become Sanbu District on April 1, 1897

Notes

References
 Nussbaum, Louis-Frédéric and Käthe Roth. (2005).  Japan encyclopedia. Cambridge: Harvard University Press. ;  OCLC 58053128
 Papinot, Edmond. (1910). Historical and Geographic Dictionary of Japan. Tokyo: Librarie Sansaisha. OCLC 77691250

External links 

  Murdoch's map of provinces, 1903

 
History of Chiba Prefecture
Former provinces of Japan
States and territories established in the 710s
1868 disestablishments in Japan
States and territories disestablished in 1868
718 establishments